Chuyunchi-Chupanovo (Suyınsı-Supan) is a rural locality (a selo) in Dmitriyevsky Selsoviet, Zilairsky District, Bashkortostan, Russia. The population was 137 as of 2010. There are 3 streets.

Geography 
Chuyunchi-Chupanovo is located 42 km northwest of Zilair (the district's administrative centre) by road. Kartlazma is the nearest rural locality.

References 

Rural localities in Zilairsky District